Gavampati may refer to:
Gavampati (chronicle), a supplementary Mon language chronicle.
Gavampati (Buddha's disciple), one of the first ten disciples of Buddha to be ordained.